The 2000 Women's Australian Hockey League (AHL) was the 8th edition women's field hockey tournament. The tournament was held in Sydney, and was contested from 7–19 March 2000.

NSWIS Arrows won the tournament for the fifth time after defeating QAS Scorchers 2–1 in extra-time, after the final finished as a 1–1 draw. ACT Strikers finished in third place after defeating WAIS Diamonds 4–2 in the third and fourth place playoff.

Participating Teams

 ACT Strikers
 NSWIS Arrows
 Territory Pearls
 QAS Scorchers
 Adelaide Suns
 Tassie Van Demons
 VIS Vipers
 WAIS Diamonds

Competition format
The 2000 Women's Australian Hockey League consisted of a single round robin format, followed by classification matches.

Teams from all 8 states and territories competed against one another throughout the pool stage. At the conclusion of the pool stage, the top four ranked teams progressed to the semi-finals, while the bottom four teams continued to the classification stage.

Point allocation

Every match in the 2000 AHL needed an outright result. In the event of a draw, golden goal extra time was played out, and if the result was still a draw a penalty shoot-out was contested, with the winner receiving a bonus point.

Results
All times are local (UTC+10:00).

Preliminary round

Pool

Fixtures

Classification round

Fifth to eighth place classification

Crossover

Seventh and eighth place

Fifth and sixth place

First to fourth place classification

Semi-finals

Third and fourth place

Final

Awards

Statistics

Final standings

Goalscorers

References

External links
Hockey Australia
Hockey NSW 

2000
2000 in Australian women's field hockey